Don't Worry Baby is a 2015 American comedy drama film written and directed by Julian Branciforte. The film stars John Magaro, Christopher McDonald and Dreama Walker.

Plot
Robert Lang (John Magaro) discovers his father Harry (Christopher McDonald) has a new child with a young woman named Sara-Beth (Dreama Walker) only to discover he also had sex with Sara-Beth shortly before his father did. Robert and Harry become determined to find out who the father of the child is.

Cast
John Magaro as Robert Lang
Christopher McDonald as Harry Lang
Dreama Walker as Sara-Beth
Talia Balsam as Miriam Lang

Release
The film was screened on April 16, 2015 at the Sarasota Film Festival and wide released on July 22, 2016.

Reception
Review aggregator website Rotten Tomatoes reported a 57% approval rating, with a rating average of 5.5/10, based on 7 reviews. On Metacritic, which assigns a normalized rating out of 100 based on reviews from critics, the film has a score of 55 based on 6 reviews, indicating "mixed or average reviews". Nick Allen of RogerEbert.com gave the film 2 out of 4 stars. Gary Goldstein of the Los Angeles Times praised John Magaro's acting stating he brought his "A-game".

References

External links
 
 
 

2015 films
American comedy-drama films
2015 comedy-drama films
2010s English-language films
2010s American films